Kim Hae-Woon (born December 25, 1973) is a South Korean former football goalkeeper and currently goalkeeper coach of Henan Construction.

Career
Kim has represented South Korea at youth level but, although part of the senior team squads (e.g. he was the third choice goalkeeper for the 2003 East Asian Cup) he never went on to play a match for them.

In 1996, he made his debut for Ilhwa Chunma (then based in Cheonan and known as Cheonan Ilhwa Chunma). Before the start of the 2000 season, Kim, together with the
entire club moved to Seongnam. The move was highly successful and the club
(now known as Seongnam Ilhwa Chunma) took over from Suwon Samsung Bluewings as the dominant force in Korean soccer.

By the end of the 2007 season, Kim had played 197 times for the Ilhwa Chunma franchise and in that time conceded 212 goals.

On 23 May 2009, he announced his retirement.

He was appointed as the U-18 team goalkeeper coach of Jeonbuk Hyundai Motors on 3 March 2010.

Club career statistics

Honours

Club

Seongnam FC
K League 1 (4) : 2001, 2002, 2003, 2006
Korean FA Cup (1) : 1999
K-League Cup (2) : 2002, 2004
Korean Super Cup (1) : 2002
AFC Champions League Runners-up (2) : 1996–97, 2004
Asian Super Cup (1): 1996
A3 Champions Cup (1): 2004
Afro-Asian Club Championship (1) : 1996

International

 EAFF East Asian Cup (1) : 2003

External links
 K-League Player Record 
 FIFA Player Statistics

1973 births
Living people
Association football goalkeepers
South Korean footballers
Seongnam FC players
K League 1 players
2000 AFC Asian Cup players
Sportspeople from Incheon